

Places 

Hildersham, Cambridgeshire, a village in eastern England
Hildersham Hill, a hill of height 95m near the village

People 

Arthur Hildersham (1563–1632), an English clergyman

Miscellaneous 

HMS Hildersham (M2705), a British minesweeper named after the Cambridgeshire village